Frank Albert Antony Wootton OBE PPGAvA (30 July 1911 – 21 April 1998) was an aviation artist, famous for his works depicting the Royal Air Force during the Second World War.

Early life
Wootton was born in Milford on Sea, Hampshire in 1911. His mother died while Frank was still of school-age, and he was raised by his father, a seaman in the Merchant Navy.

He attended art school in 1928 at the age of seventeen, winning a travel scholarship and a gold medal from the Eastbourne School of Art and a prize of £25, which he used to fund a three-month trip to Germany, painting murals.

Early career and World War II
In the 1930s, Wootton was commissioned by Edward Saunders to do art and book illustrations. In this time he wrote several books on art instruction, one of which, How to Draw Aircraft, went on to be a best-seller, In 1939, he volunteered for the Royal Air Force but instead was invited by the commander-in-chief of the Allied Air Forces to accept a special duty commission as war artist to the R.A.F. and Royal Canadian Air Force. He painted RAF subjects from England to France and Belgium before travelling to Southeast Asia at the end of World War II. It is for this work advancing the field of aviation art, that Wootton is recognised as "probably the finest aviation artist of all time".

Later life

The inaugural of the National Air and Space Museum featured an exhibition on Wootton's work.

Frank Wootton was also an extraordinary landscape and equestrian artist. His love of horses was unparalleled and he became vice-President of the Society of Equestrian Artists.

He was commissioned to paint the greatest steeplechaser of all time, Arkle, in 1966 - 'Arkle with Pat Taaffe up'. He also had racehorses in training with Fred Winter.

For service in World War II, Frank Wootton was awarded the Order of the British Empire in 1995. He died in April 1998, at Alfriston, Sussex.

References
 England & Wales, Birth Index: 1837–1983 > 1911 > Q3–Jul–Aug-Sep > Lymington (Hampshire), Vol 2b, p. 1202; Frank A A Wootton (Mother's maiden name Peppler)
 England & Wales, Death Index: 1916–2007 > 1998 > April> Eastbourne, Sussex C41E District 4541C Entry 231; Frank Albert A Wootton b 30 Jul 1914 Age at Death 83. (Genealogists note: Birth date shown is incorrect - it should read 1911 Age at Death 86. The person registering the death is always asked the age at death, and thus birth year, and without other proof, e.g. birth certificate, an estimate is made, thus it is often incorrect. No reliance should ever be made on the accuracy of birth dates given on UK death certificates; birth entries must be researched as above).

External links

 

20th-century English painters
English male painters
Officers of the Order of the British Empire
1911 births
1998 deaths
World War II artists
British war artists
People from Milford on Sea
People from Alfriston
British railway artists
20th-century English male artists
Aviation artists